Four on the Floor or 4 on the Floor may refer to:

Art, entertainment, and media

Music

Genre
Four on the floor (music), a style of dance music with a steady, uniform 4/4 beat

Groups
The 4onthefloor, blues band from Minneapolis, Minnesota

Albums

4 on the Floor, an early (ca. 1988), self-produced album by Natalie MacMaster
Four on the Floor, a 1991 live album by The Nylons
Four on the Floor (Dag Nasty album), a 1992 album by the American band
 4 On The Floor, a 1995 album by the eurodance group Mr. President
Four on the Floor (compilation album), a 1999 compilation album by bands on Panic Button Records
Four on the Floor (EP), a 2003 EP by Australian rock band The Living End
Four on the Floor (Juliette and the Licks album), a 2006 by the American band

Songs
"Four on the Floor" (Lee Brice song), a song by Lee Brice from Love Like Crazy
"Four on the Floor" (Spiderbait song), a 2001 song by Spiderbait from The Flight of Wally Funk

Television
Four on the Floor (U.S. TV program), a 1994 American music TV program that aired on VH1
Four on the Floor (Canadian TV series), a 1986 Canadian comedy television series that aired on CBC Television

Other uses
Four on the floor (transmission), a type of four-speed manual transmission with a floor-mounted shifter
Four on the Floor, another name for the Wonderland murders, a 1981 crime in Los Angeles

See also
Four to the floor